Leonid Lytvynenko (Leonid Dmitriyevich Litvinenko; born 28 January 1949) is a Soviet athlete who competed mainly in the Decathlon. He trained at Burevestnik in Kiev.

Lytvynenko began athletics at age 16. He was a member of the USSR National Team since 1969. He competed for the USSR in the 1972 Summer Olympics held in Munich in the Decathlon where he won the Silver medal. He was also the 1970 USSR Champion and the winner of the 5th Spartakiad of the Peoples of the USSR in decathlon. In 1972 Litvinenko was awarded the Order of the Badge of Honor.

References

External links
 

1949 births
Living people
People from Smila
Soviet decathletes
Ukrainian decathletes
Olympic silver medalists for the Soviet Union
Olympic silver medalists in athletics (track and field)
Athletes (track and field) at the 1972 Summer Olympics
Athletes (track and field) at the 1976 Summer Olympics
Olympic athletes of the Soviet Union
Medalists at the 1972 Summer Olympics
Burevestnik (sports society) athletes
Sportspeople from Cherkasy Oblast